The 2023 Croatia Rally (also known as the Rally Croatia 2023) will be a motor racing event for rally cars that is held over four days between 20 and 23 April 2023. It would mark the 47th running of the Croatia Rally, and would be the fourth round of the 2023 World Rally Championship, World Rally Championship-2 and World Rally Championship-3. The event would also be the second round of the 2023 Junior World Rally Championship.

Kalle Rovanperä and Jonne Halttunen are the defending rally winners. Their team, Toyota Gazoo Racing WRT, are the defending manufacturer's winners. Yohan Rossel and Valentin Sarreaud are the defending rally winners in the WRC-2 category. Zoltán László and Tamás Kürti are the defending rally winners in the WRC-3 category. Lauri Joona and Mikael Korhonen are the defending rally winners in the junior category.

Background

Itinerary
All dates and times are CEST (UTC+2).

References

External links
  
 2023 Croatia Rally at eWRC-results.com
 2023 Croatia Rally at rally-maps.com 

2023 in Croatian sport
Croatia
April 2023 sports events in Croatia
2023
Scheduled sports events